Isabelle Duchesnay (born December 18, 1963 in Aylmer, Quebec, Canada) is a retired ice dancer who represented France for most of her career. With her brother Paul Duchesnay, she is the 1991 World champion and the 1992 Olympic silver medalist.

Career 
The Duchesnays started skating at an early age in Canada in pairs. Their first major success came at the 1982 Canadian Nationals, where they placed second in the junior competition. After a serious accident where Isabelle hit her head, they switched to ice dancing. Over time, the Duchesnays’ skating became more innovative and revolutionary with help from 1984 Olympic champion Christopher Dean. After Skate Canada criticized their skating, they decided to leave the Canadian team. In 1985, they began skating for their mother’s homeland, France. They were coached by Martin Skotnicky, based in Obertsdorf, Germany.

The Duchesnays' 1988 Winter Olympics programs were considered unusual. Their free dance, a jungle-inspired dance set to drums, was not well received by judges and they finished eighth overall. Despite the judges’ reactions, the Duchesnays continued skating in their unusual and innovative style. They placed third and second in the 1989 and 1990 World Championships, respectively. They won their only World title at the 1991 Worlds in Munich, Germany.

The Duchesnays were favoured to win gold at the 1992 Winter Olympics in Albertville, France. They won the silver medal behind Marina Klimova and Sergei Ponomarenko. The Duchesnays then retired from amateur competition and competed professionally until Paul suffered a serious rollerblading accident in 1996.

In 1996, the Duchesnays were nominated for a Gemini Award in Best Performance - Performing Arts Program or Series for their performance in "The Planets". Isabelle Duchesnay wrote a book, Notre passion (Sports pour tous), in 1992.

Personal life 
Isabelle Duchesnay was born to a French mother and Canadian father. She also had an elder brother, Gaston who died in 1991. She married British ice dancer Christopher Dean in 1991; they divorced in 1993.

Results
(ice dance with Paul Duchesnay)

Amateur Career Programs

References

External links

The Duchesnays at Figure Skating Corner
Dean and Duchesnay to divorce
New York Times articles on the Duchesnays
Care to Ice Dance? - Duchesnay & Duchesnay

1963 births
Living people
Canadian female ice dancers
French female ice dancers
Olympic figure skaters of France
Figure skaters at the 1988 Winter Olympics
Figure skaters at the 1992 Winter Olympics
Olympic silver medalists for France
Sportspeople from Gatineau
French Quebecers
Olympic medalists in figure skating
World Figure Skating Championships medalists
European Figure Skating Championships medalists
Medalists at the 1992 Winter Olympics